Donald P. Wagner (born December 3, 1960) is an American politician, currently serving as a member of the Orange County Board of Supervisors for the 3rd district and chair. He previously served as mayor of Irvine, California and as a Republican member of the California State Assembly, representing the 68th district, which includes portions of Orange County. In 2019, Wagner won a seat as a nonpartisan representative on the Orange County Board of Supervisors, representing District 3.

Education and family
Wagner received a bachelor's degree in English from the University of California, Los Angeles, and a Juris Doctor in 1987 from the University of California, Hastings College of the Law and was admitted to the California Bar in the same year.

Wagner is married to Orange County Superior Court Judge Megan Wagner, and he and his family resides in Irvine, California.

Legal and political career
Wagner was an attorney for Kindel and Anderson from 1987 to 1993, and for Wagner and Associates from 1993 to 1998. He has been an attorney for Wagner Lautsch Limited Liability Partnership since 1998.

Wagner served on several committees or advisory boards for the Orange County Bar Association and as a Judge Pro Tempore in the Superior Court of Orange County. Other previous positions include three active terms as a member of the South Orange County Community College District Board of Trustees. He founded and served as the first president of the Orange County Chapter of the Federalist Society.

In 2013, he sought election to the California State Senate to succeed Mimi Walters, who was elected to the United States House of Representatives the prior year.  He lost the special election to Orange County Supervisor John Moorlach.

He won the 2016 Irvine mayoral election, and won reelection in the 2018 Irvine mayoral election. He won the Orange County Third District Supervisorial seat in 2019, and currently holds the seat.

California State Assemblyman

In 2010, Wagner narrowly won the Republican primary election for the 70th Assembly District over Irvine City Councilman Steven Choi. He then won the general election with 58.2% of the votes.

For the 2011–2012 legislative session, Wagner was appointed to these committees:
 Aging and Long-Term Care Committee
 Appropriations Committee
 Budget Committee
 Education Committee
 Judiciary Committee – Vice Chair

2014 California State Assembly

Orange County Board of Supervisors
Shortly after taking office in 2019, Supervisor Wagner successfully brought together four large entities to negotiate the reopening of a public resource known as Irvine Lake for shoreline fishing. The Orange County Register named him one of OC's Most Influential People in 2019 in recognition for his leadership at the Board.  Wagner stated public safety is also a top priority of his. In 2020, he identified and allocated funding to process a 30-year sexual assault kit backlog at the County of Orange, which led to the prosecution of a longtime sex offender and several individuals placed on national sex offender registries. The County had over 1,500 unprocessed rape kits and is set to complete testing by the fall of 2021.

Political ratings
 Project Vote Smart provides the following results from legislative scorecards.
 National Rifle Association – A in 2010

COVID-19 vaccine comments
In April 2021, Wagner inquired about whether COVID-19 vaccines contained "tracking devices" in response to constituents and public commentators making claims falsely asserting so. This led to public controversy with people accusing Wagner of promoting these claims. In response, Wagner has denied that this was the case and stated that he does not believe in "vaccine conspiracies," while demanding retractions from various media outlets and individuals for publishing what he asserted was "misinformation." Several media outlets later updated their stories by verifying sources, including a quote from Dr. Chau, who made a clarifying statement that his reaction was at the public commentators and not at Wagner.

References

External links
 Wagner's Facebook profile
 Project Vote Smart Biography
 Join California Donald P. Wagner

Living people
University of California, Los Angeles alumni
University of California, Hastings College of the Law alumni
Republican Party members of the California State Assembly
Mayors of Irvine, California
Orange County Supervisors
People from Irvine, California
California state court judges
1960 births
21st-century American politicians
Federalist Society members